The 2014 Asian Games featured 49 competition venues and 48 training facilities on the sixteen days Games competition from September 19 to October 4, 2014. Of them, there are ten venues are newly built. All of the competition venues will be used after the opening ceremony bar football venues, which is held from September 14, 2014.

Sporting venues

Bupyeong District

Dong District

Ganghwa County

Gyeyang District

Jung District

Nam District

Namdong District

Seo District

Yeonsu District

Outside Incheon

Gyeonggi Province

Others

References

 
Venues
2014